Virginie Despentes (born 13 June 1969) is a French writer, novelist, and filmmaker. She is known for her work exploring gender, sexuality, and people who live in poverty or other marginalised conditions.

Work
Despentes' work is an inventory of youth marginalization; it pertains to the sexual revolution lived by Generation X and to the acclimation of pornography in public spaces through new communication techniques. With a transgressive exploration of obscenity's limits, as a novelist or a film-maker she proposes social critique and an antidote to the new moral order. Her characters deal with misery and injustice, self-violence such as drug addiction, or violence towards others such as rape or terrorism, violences she has also suffered from. She is one of the most popular French authors from this era. Her book King Kong Theory is sometimes taught in gender studies and "often passed down to millennial women as a recommendation from a cool, not-that-much-older mentor." For years after the release of her 1993 novel Rape Me, she was depicted by French literary institutions as an outsider or "enfant terrible", and drew criticism from both the political left and right. Later works such as Apocalypse Bébé (2010) and the Vernon Subutex trilogy (2015–17) received many positive reviews.

Life and career
Virginie Despentes was born as Virginie Daget in 1969. She grew up in Nancy, France in a working-class family. Her parents were postal workers. At fifteen years of age, she was admitted to a psychiatric hospital against her will by her parents. She later noted, "I’m sure now that I would never have been locked up if I had been born a boy. The antics that caused me to end up in a psych ward were not that feral."

When she was seventeen years old, Despentes left her home and abandoned her schooling. As a teenager, she was a hitchhiker and followed rock bands. While hitchhiking with a friend at age seventeen, Despentes was threatened by three young men with a rifle and then gang-raped. She had a switchblade in her pocket, but she was too scared to use it.

Despentes settled in Lyon, where she worked as a maid, a prostitute in "massage parlors" and peep shows, a sales clerk in a record store, a freelance rock journalist, and a pornographic film critic.

In 1994, her first book Baise-moi was published. The book focused on two female sex workers who go on a killing spree after one of them is gang-raped. For the book, she had taken the pen name, "Despentes," which was inspired by La Croix-Rousse, her old neighborhood in Lyon. The neighborhood was hilly; "pente" is French for hill. She had chosen the pen name so that her family could have some distance from the book.

Despentes moved to Paris. In 2000, she directed her first film, Baise-moi, an adaptation of her own novel, co-directed with former pornographic actress Coralie Trinh Thi. It starred Karen Lancaume and Raffaëla Anderson. Baise-moi is a contemporary example of a rape and revenge film, an exploitation films genre. After the release of the 1993 novel, and the film adaptation was highly controversial.

When discussing her life and work, Despentes explained,I became a prostitute and walked the streets in low-cut tops and high-heeled shoes owing no one an explanation, and I kept and spent every penny I earned. I hitchhiked, I was raped, I hitchhiked again. I wrote a first novel and published it under my own, clearly female first name, not imagining for a second that when it came out I’d be continually lectured to about all the boundaries that should never be crossed. . . . I wanted to live like a man, so I lived like a man.Her novel Les Jolies Choses was adapted for the screen in 2001 by Gilles Paquet-Brenner, with Marion Cotillard and Stomy Bugsy in the lead roles. The film was awarded the Michel d'Ornano prize at the 2001 Deauville American Film Festival.

From 2004 to 2005, she wrote a blog that documented her daily life. Around this time she began identifying as a lesbian and started to date Spanish philosopher Paul B. Preciado before he transitioned to male.

In 2005, she wrote three songs for the album Va Chercher la Police for the group A.S. Dragon.

In 2006, she published a non-fiction work, King Kong Theory. It recounts her experiences in the French sex industry, and the infamy and praise she experienced for writing Baise-Moi.

In 2009 she directed her first documentary, Mutantes (Féminisme Porno Punk), which was broadcast on TV Pink.

In 2010, her novel Apocalypse bébé was awarded the Renaudot prize.

Bye Bye Blondie was adapted for film with Béatrice Dalle and Emmanuelle Béart. Cecilia Backes and Salima Boutebal produced a stage adaptation of King Kong Theory during the "Outside" Festival d'Avignon.

In 2011, her commentary on Dominique Strauss-Kahn appeared in The Guardian.

The English translation of her novel Vernon Subutex 1 was shortlisted for the 2018 Man Booker International Prize.

Reception
In 2018, Lauren Elkin discussed her early dislike of Despentes and other writers such as Kathy Acker, writing about Rape Me, "There was an anger and a sarcasm in the writing that I turned away from. I felt too much empathy for [Séverine] to mock her. Despentes seemed content to judge Séverine superficially, and it felt to me like a betrayal of the novelist’s task to render some human truth on the page. [...] The book reads as if Despentes had a personal score to settle with some phantom woman offstage. [...] It felt to me like Acker and Despentes were jutting out their chins trying to prove they could produce work that was as ugly and aggressive as a man’s". She noted that critics also "derided Despentes for lacking a 'literary style'". Elkin highly praised the later Despentes books Pretty Things, King Kong Theory, and Vernon Subutex, saying that Pretty Things "wickedly refutes the stereotype of the chic French girl and exposes the sham at the heart of femininity. And it shows our complicity, male and female, individual and corporate, in keeping the sham of femininity alive." Pretty Things was also praised by multiple critics after Emma Ramadan's translation.

Anthony Cummins, reviewing Vernon Subutex 3, wrote that "the novel’s real energy, somewhere between contrarian op-ed and off-colour standup, lies in how Despentes stays out of the picture to let the story unfold through the thoughts of its large, 20-plus cast [...] it’s a dark story of how violence can be turned to entertainment for the sake of profit. It can be exhausting, but it’s also invigorating, and there isn’t really anything else like it right now."

Awards and Distinctions
Despentes won the 1998 Prix de Flore, and 1999 Prix Saint-Valentin for Les Jolies Choses; 2010 Prix Renaudot for Apocalypse Bébé.

She was named a member of the Académie Goncourt on January 5, 2016. Despentes resigned from this position on January 5, 2020 in order to dedicate more time to writing.

In 2018, Despentes was shortlisted for the International Booker Prize, for Vernon Subutex 1, translated into English by Frank Wynne.

Bibliography

Novels
Baise-moi. 1993; Grasset, 1999, 

Les Chiennes savantes. Éditions J'ai lu, 1997
Les Jolies choses. J'ai lu, 2008, 
Pretty Things, translated into English by Emma Ramadan, The Feminist Press at CUNY, 2018, 
1999 - Mordre au travers.
Teen spirit. 2002, J'ai lu, 2004, 
2002 - Trois étoiles.
Bye bye Blondie: roman, Grasset, 2004, 
King Kong théorie, Grasset, 2006
King Kong Theorie,  Berlin Verlag, 2007, 
; Translator Stéphanie Benson, Feminist Press, 2010, 
2010 - Apocalypse Bébé.
 King Kong Theory - translated into English (Feminist Press 2010)
 Apocalypse Baby - translated into English (Feminist Press 2015)
 2015 Vernon Subutex: Volume 1 (published in English by MacLehose Press 2017, translated by Frank Wynne) - shortlisted for the International Booker Prize
 2015 Vernon Subutex: Volume 2 (Éditions Grasset, published in English by MacLehose Press 2018, translated by Frank Wynne)
 2017 Vernon Subutex: Volume 3 (Éditions Grasset, published in English by MacLehose Press 2021, translated by Frank Wynne)
2018 Pretty Things (Les Jolies Choses, Éditions Grasset,1998) published in English by The Feminist Press in a translation by Emma Ramadan
2022

Stories
1997 : « C'est dehors, c'est la nuit », recueil collectif Dix, Grasset / Les Inrockuptibles.
1999 : Mordre au travers, recueil de nouvelles, Librio.
2004 : « Toujours aussi pute », Revue Bordel, n°2, Flammarion.
2004 : « Putain, je déteste le foot... », biography of Lemmy Kilmister of the group Motörhead, Rock & Folk, n°444.
2004 : une nouvelle dans le recueil Des nouvelles du Prix de Flore, Flammarion.
2009 : « I put a spell on you », Psychologies magazine, Hors série « Les Secrets de l'érotisme ».

See also
 List of female film and television directors
 List of lesbian filmmakers
 List of LGBT-related films directed by women

References

External links
Serpent's Tail author page

Review of King Kong Theory
Review of Apocalypse Baby
LRB career overview and review of Apocalypse Baby
"Virginie Despentes décape à vif" L'Express, Marianne Payot, 19 August 2010 
VernonSubutex.net official site for the book in English

1969 births
Living people
Writers from Nancy, France
French women screenwriters
French screenwriters
French film directors
French women novelists
Lambda Literary Award winners
French women film directors
French lesbian writers
Prix Renaudot winners
Mass media people from Nancy, France